Jordan Cano (born February 3, 1996) is an American soccer player.

Career

College 
Cano played four years of college soccer at Southern Methodist University between 2014 and 2017, making 75 appearances for the Mustangs. He was named American Athletic Conference’s Defender of the Year in 2017.

Professional 
After Cano graduated from college, he signed a homegrown player contract with FC Dallas on January 11, 2018. He was loaned to United Soccer League side Oklahoma City Energy on March 16, 2018.

Cano was released by Dallas the end of their 2018 season.

References

External links 
 Mustangs Bio
 

1996 births
Living people
American soccer players
Association football defenders
FC Dallas players
Homegrown Players (MLS)
OKC Energy FC players
SMU Mustangs men's soccer players
Soccer players from Texas
Sportspeople from Plano, Texas